The Image is a 1975 American adult drama that was re-released in an edited version in 1976. The film is also known by two other titles: The Punishment of Anne and The Mistress and the Slave and was directed by Radley Metzger. The film is based upon the classic 1956 sadomasochistic novel L'Image, written by Catherine Robbe-Grillet and published under the pseudonym of "Jean de Berg".

Premise
Jean, a middle-aged writer living in Paris, meets an old friend, Claire, and is soon drawn into her world of sadomasochism along with Claire's younger partner Anne.

Structure
The film is divided in 10 chapters, titles in white letters on a black background:

Cast
 Carl Parker as Jean
 Marilyn Roberts as Claire 
 Mary Mendum (Rebecca Brooke) as Anne then Metzger's girlfriend
 Valerie Marron as a Salesgirl

Reactions
 "Anyone into sado-masochism will get obvious fulfillment by watching the surface physical thrills that Metzger provides. The true fulfillment for this viewer was delving deeper into the themes of dominance and submission that the characters were exploring in their relationships." – Boris Lugosi
 "This is a must own for anyone interested in the fetishes portrayed (graphic oral sex, bondage, whipping, and urination), and also for those who would like to see what quality porn can look like."

Reception
The Image received mixed critical reviews. Buzz Burgess of DVDTalk gave the film four out of five stars for content, stating that "Metzger [...] has created a piece argued by some to be the best erotic film ever made." Charles Tatum, of eFilmCritic.com disliked the film, awarding it just two out of five stars, citing a lack of substance, "The Image is just that- pretty pictures of pretty people whipping each other during sexual sessions. Its infamy is understandable, but not deserved." Michael Den Boer praised the actor's performances, especially Brooke's, even implying that she carried the film with her portrayal of Anne. Although initially praised in Germany, the film became controversial later, and withdrawn from circulation.

Notes
The film The Image was released  during the Golden Age of Porn (inaugurated by the 1969 release of Andy Warhol Blue Movie) in the United States, at a time of "porno chic", in which adult erotic films were just beginning to be widely released, publicly discussed by celebrities (like Johnny Carson and Bob Hope) and taken seriously by film critics (like Roger Ebert).

According to one film reviewer, Radley Metzger's films, including those made during the Golden Age of Porn (1969–1984), are noted for their "lavish design, witty screenplays, and a penchant for the unusual camera angle". Another reviewer noted that his films were "highly artistic — and often cerebral ... and often featured gorgeous cinematography". Film and audio works by Metzger have been added to the permanent collection of the Museum of Modern Art (MoMA) in New York City.

Blu-ray release
In 2011, Synapse Films re-released The Image on Blu-ray and DVD. The original 35mm negatives were scanned to facilitate the high definition release. In addition to the visual remastering, the audio was also reworked for the re-release, adding DTS-HD Master Audio 5.1 to the Blu-ray. Synapse also created new cover art for the re-release.

See also

 Andy Warhol filmography
 Erotic art
 Erotic films in the United States
 Erotic photography
 Golden Age of Porn
 List of American films of 1975
 Sadism and masochism in fiction
 Sex in film
 Unsimulated sex

References

Further reading
 
 Heffernan, Kevin, "A social poetics of pornography", Quarterly Review of Film and Video, Volume 15, Issue 3, December 1994, pp. 77–83. .
 Lehman, Peter, Pornography: film and culture, Rutgers depth of field series, Rutgers University Press, 2006, .
 Williams, Linda, Hard core: power, pleasure, and the "frenzy of the visible", University of California Press, 1999, .

External links
 The Image at  MUBI (related to The Criterion Collection)
 
 
 

American erotic drama films
American pornographic films
BDSM in films
Films based on French novels
Films directed by Radley Metzger
1975 films
1970s erotic drama films
1970s pornographic films
1975 drama films
Films set in Paris
1970s American films